The 2004 Eisenhower Trophy took place 28–31 October at Rio Mar Country Club in Río Grande, Puerto Rico. It was the 24th World Amateur Team Championship for the Eisenhower Trophy. The tournament was a 72-hole stroke play team event with 66 three-man teams. The best two scores for each round counted towards the team total. Each team was due to play two rounds on the two courses. The leading teams played on the River course on the third day and were due to play on the Ocean course on the final day.

Heavy rain and lightning caused the final day to be abandoned and the event was reduced to 54 holes. The leading 36 teams had played their third round on the River course while the others played on the Ocean course.

The United States won their 13th Eisenhower Trophy, nine strokes ahead of Spain, who took the silver medal. Sweden took the bronze medal while Canada, Italy and Switzerland finished tied for fourth place. Ryan Moore had the best 54-hole aggregate of 204, 12 under par.

The 2004 Espirito Santo Trophy was played on the same courses one week prior.

Teams
66 three-man teams contested the event.

The following table lists the players on the leading teams.

Results

Source:

The leading 36 teams played their third round on the River course with the remaining teams playing on the Ocean course.

Individual leaders
There was no official recognition for the lowest individual scores.

Source:

Players in the leading teams played two rounds on the River course and one on the Ocean course.

References

External links
Record Book on International Golf Federation website

Eisenhower Trophy
Golf tournaments in Puerto Rico
Eisenhower Trophy
Eisenhower Trophy
Eisenhower Trophy